George Brammer was an English professional footballer who played as a full back.

Brammer made his first appearance for Lincoln City in 1890 when they were playing in the Midland League, in total he only played eight matches but only two in the Football League and they were on Good Friday and Easter Saturday in 1893.

References

1873 births
English footballers
Association football defenders
Lincoln City F.C. players
English Football League players
Year of death missing